The 1934 German Grand Prix was a Grand Prix motor race held at the Nürburgring on 15 July 1934.

Classification

Race

Starting Grid Positions
Starting grid was determined by ballot.

Notes
Manfred von Brauchitsch badly crashed in practice, and Mercedes employee Hanns Geier was called on short notice to replace him
www.kolumbus.fi
www.teamdan.com 
www.racing-database.com

German Grand Prix
German Grand Prix
Grand Prix